Folia is a genus of larvacean tunicates (class Appendicularia) in the family Oikopleuridae.

References

External links 

 Folia at WoRMS

Appendicularia
Tunicate genera